Robert Francis Wanzer (June 4, 1921 – January 23, 2016) was an American professional basketball player and coach. A five time NBA All-Star and three time All-NBA Second Team selection, Wanzer played his entire professional career for the Rochester Royals of the Basketball Association of America (BAA) and National Basketball Association (NBA). He won an NBA championship with the Royals in 1951. During his final two years as a player, he served as the team's player-coach. After he retired  from playing in 1957, he remained as a coach with the Royals for one season, before he became the head coach of the St. John Fisher Cardinals college basketball team in 1963. He stayed in the role with the college for 24 years until his retirement in 1987. Wanzer was inducted into the Naismith Memorial Basketball Hall of Fame in 1987.

College career and military service
A 6'0" guard, Wanzer played collegiately at Seton Hall University. After leading Seton Hall to a 16–2 record as a sophomore, Wanzer enlisted in the United States Marine Corps. He made the All-Pacific Armed Forces All-Star basketball team, and participated in the occupation of Guam.

Professional career
Wanzer was selected by the Rochester Royals in 1948. Royals star Bob Davies was a Seton Hall coach and steered the star guard to the NBL contender.  Initially a reserve behind Al Cervi and Red Holzman, Wanzer later teamed with Davies to form a potent backcourt for the day. The Royals were very successful from 1947–1954, and their smaller stars, like Wanzer, were considered their biggest assets. With Wanzer, Rochester won the 1950–51 National Basketball Association (NBA) title.

Wanzer played his entire career with the Royals, retiring from play after the end of the 1957 season.  He was a five-time All-Star with the Royals, made the All-NBA Second Team three consecutive times and, in the 1951–52 season, Wanzer became the first player to ever shoot over 90% from the free throw line in a season.

Coaching career
Wanzer served as the player-coach of the Royals for two years, and then, after the franchise moved to Cincinnati, coached for another season. His 1957–58 Cincinnati Royals team were an NBA championship contender, but injuries stopped the team short. When star Maurice Stokes was permanently injured, Wanzer moved on early the following NBA season.

In 1962, Wanzer became the first coach at St. John Fisher College in Pittsford, New York.  He coached there for 24 seasons and also served as the school's athletic director.

Personal life
Wanzer died on January 23, 2016, at his home in Pittsford, New York.

Pre-deceased by his wife, Nina Penrose Wanzer and son-in-law Darrel Dupra he was survived by daughters, Mary and Beth Wanzer and son, Bobby (Nancy) Wanzer; grandchildren Jeff, Zach and Whitney Dupra, Marti and Madison Wanzer; great-granddaughter Seneca Hernandez Dupra; and sister, Marilyn (Robert) Ulrich.

Legacy
He was inducted into the Naismith Memorial Basketball Hall of Fame in 1987. He is also a member of the Seton Hall College Hall of Fame, among others.

On August 17, 2007, Wanzer was inducted into the United States Marine Corps Sports Hall of Fame.

BAA/NBA career statistics

Regular season

Playoffs

References

External links
 
 Basketball-Reference.com: Bobby Wanzer (as player)
 Basketball-Reference.com: Bobby Wanzer (as coach)

1921 births
2016 deaths
Amateur Athletic Union men's basketball players
American men's basketball coaches
American men's basketball players
Basketball coaches from New York (state)
Basketball players from New York City
Cincinnati Royals head coaches
College men's basketball head coaches in the United States
Guards (basketball)
Naismith Memorial Basketball Hall of Fame inductees
National Basketball Association All-Stars
National Collegiate Basketball Hall of Fame inductees
Player-coaches
Rochester Royals draft picks
Rochester Royals head coaches
Rochester Royals players
Seton Hall Pirates men's basketball players
Sportspeople from Brooklyn
United States Marine Corps personnel of World War II